Jon Robertson (born 25 April 1989) is a Scottish professional footballer who plays as a midfielder for Scottish Championship side Alloa Athletic.

He was previously with Cowdenbeath on three occasions, St Mirren, Stenhousemuir and also Stoneyburn and Rosyth on loan.

Career
Robertson began his career as a youth player for Hearts before joining Murieston Boys Club.

Cowdenbeath
Robertson signed for Cowdenbeath and made his first team debut as a substitute on 5 January 2008, in a Scottish Second Division match against Ayr United. In all he made 12 appearances in his debut season.

During the 2008–09 season he went on loan to junior sides Stoneyburn and Rosyth. Robertson was made captain of Cowdenbeath at the age of 22, for season 2011–12 and led the club to the Second Division title. He was nominated for the PFA Scotland Second Division Player of the Year award in April 2012.

St Mirren
On 6 February 2012, Robertson signed a pre-contract agreement with Scottish Premier League side St Mirren. He joined them in the summer and signed a two-year contract. Robertson was given the number eight shirt. On 4 August 2012, he made his club debut, coming on as an 80th-minute substitute in a Scottish Premier League match against Inverness, replacing Gary Teale in a 2–2 draw. His first goal came on 1 December 2012, scoring the final goal in a 2–0 win over Brechin City in the Scottish Cup. He was then sent out on loan to Cowdenbeath at the end of January 2013.

Cowdenbeath
On 31 January 2013, Robertson returned to Scottish First Division side Cowdenbeath on a months loan deal.

On 29 August 2013, Robertson again returned to Cowdenbeath, this time on a permanent deal. He made his 'third' debut for the club on 31 August 2013, scoring in a 3–2 win against Dumbarton.

Stenhousemuir
At the end of the 2014–15 season, Roberston left Cowdenbeath and signed a one-year contract with fellow Scottish League One side Stenhousemuir. After one season with the Warriors, Robertson was released by the club in May 2016.

Alloa Athletic
Shortly after his release from Stenhousemuir, Robertson signed for recently relegated side Alloa Athletic.

Career statistics

References

External links

 (wrong spelling of first name)

1989 births
Living people
Footballers from Edinburgh
Scottish footballers
Association football midfielders
Heart of Midlothian F.C. players
Cowdenbeath F.C. players
St Mirren F.C. players
Stenhousemuir F.C. players
Alloa Athletic F.C. players
Stoneyburn F.C. players
Scottish Football League players
Scottish Premier League players
Scottish Professional Football League players